Fjärdvättingen is a Swedish island belonging to the Piteå archipelago. The island is located off the coast of Jävrebodarna. The island has no shore connection but it has a number of summer houses.

References 

Islands of Sweden